The Wills Wing XC (Cross Country) is an American high-wing, single-place, hang glider that was designed and produced by Wills Wing of Santa Ana, California. Now out of production, when it was available the aircraft was supplied complete and ready-to-fly.

The XC was Wills Wing's third hang glider model produced.

Design and development
The aircraft is made from aluminum tubing, with the single-surface wing covered in Dacron sailcloth and  cable braced from a single kingpost.

The XC models are each named for their rough wing area in square feet.

Variants
XC-132
Very small-sized model for lighter pilots.
XC-142
Small-sized model for lighter pilots.
XC-155
Mid-sized model for medium-weight pilots.
XC-185
Large-sized model for heavier pilots.

Aircraft on display
Canada Aviation and Space Museum - XC-185

Specifications (XC-185)

References

XC
Hang gliders